The first season of the American television series Star Trek: Discovery is set a decade before the events of Star Trek: The Original Series and follows the crew of the USS Discovery during the Federation–Klingon war. The season was produced by CBS Television Studios in association with Secret Hideout, Roddenberry Entertainment, and Living Dead Guy Productions, with Gretchen J. Berg and Aaron Harberts serving as showrunners, and Akiva Goldsman providing producing support.

Sonequa Martin-Green stars as Michael Burnham, first officer of the USS Shenzhou and later the Discovery, along with Doug Jones, Shazad Latif, Anthony Rapp, Mary Wiseman, and Jason Isaacs. The series was announced in November 2015, and Bryan Fuller joined as showrunner the next February. He brought on Berg and Harberts to support him, and they took over as showrunners when Fuller left the series in October 2016 following creative disagreements with CBS. The season's war storyline was intended to represent the divide between different political factions of the modern United States, with effort put into redesigning the Klingon species and developing their culture and biology. Filming took place in Toronto, Canada, from January to October 2017, with additional filming on location in Jordan for the series premiere. The crew, including the visual effects team—led by Pixomondo—and composer Jeff Russo, aimed for the series' production values to match that of a feature film. The season features several guest stars taking on roles from The Original Series.

The first episode was broadcast on CBS and released on the streaming service CBS All Access on September 24, 2017. The rest of the 15-episode season was released weekly on All Access in two chapters: the first ended on November 12, and the second was released from January 7 to February 11, 2018. The season led to record subscriptions for All Access, and generally positive reviews from critics who highlighted Martin-Green's performance, the production values, and new additions to Star Trek canon. Some criticized the writing. The season was nominated for two Primetime Emmy Awards and received several other awards and nominations. A second season was ordered in October 2017.

Episodes

In March 2018, a "secret scene" was released depicting an alternative ending to the season finale, in which Mirror Georgiou is approached by an operative of Section 31. This storyline is further explored in the second season.

Cast and characters

Main
 Sonequa Martin-Green as Michael Burnham
 Doug Jones as Saru
 Shazad Latif as Voq / Ash Tyler
 Anthony Rapp as Paul Stamets
 Mary Wiseman as Sylvia Tilly
 Jason Isaacs as Gabriel Lorca

Recurring
 Michelle Yeoh as Philippa Georgiou
 Mary Chieffo as L'Rell
 James Frain as Sarek
 Kenneth Mitchell as Kol
 Jayne Brook as Katrina Cornwell
 Wilson Cruz as Hugh Culber

Notable guests
 Mia Kirshner as Amanda Grayson
 Rainn Wilson as Harry Mudd
 Katherine Barrell as Stella Mudd
 Clint Howard as an Orion drug dealer

Production

Development

On November 2, 2015, CBS announced that a new Star Trek television series would premiere in January 2017, "on the heels" of Star Trek: The Original Series 50th anniversary in 2016. The series would be developed specifically for the streaming service CBS All Access. Bryan Fuller was hired to be showrunner and executive producer in February 2016, as well as co-creator with Alex Kurtzman. Fuller began his career writing for the series Star Trek: Deep Space Nine and Star Trek: Voyager, and had publicly called for Star Trek to return to television for years after the end of the previous series, Star Trek: Enterprise, in 2005. When Fuller first met with CBS about the series, the company did not have a plan for what the show would be. He proposed an anthology series where each season would be a standalone, serialized show set in a different era, beginning with a prequel to the original series. CBS told Fuller to start with a single serialized show and see how that performs first, and so he began further developing the prequel concept. In June, Fuller announced that the first season would consist of 13 episodes, and a month later, at Star Treks 50th anniversary San Diego Comic-Con panel, he revealed the series' title to be Star Trek: Discovery. He also said it would be set in the "Prime Timeline" alongside the previous Star Trek series, rather than in the alternate "Kelvin Timeline" that the concurrent Star Trek film series was set in.

At the end of July, CBS hired David Semel, a veteran television procedural director who was under an overall deal with the studio, to direct the first episode for Discovery. Fuller did not approve of this decision, believing that Semel was "wrong for the job" and wanting a more visionary director to establish the style of the series. Fuller had personally reached out to Edgar Wright to direct the first episode before CBS hired Semel. As development and pre-production on the series continued, Fuller and Semel "clashed" on the direction of the show. The series was also starting to overrun its per-episode budget. Fuller was attempting to design new sets, costumes, and aliens for the series while heading the series' writers room and also spending considerable time addressing his commitments as showrunner of another new series, American Gods. This caused frustration among CBS executives that were pushing for a January 2017 debut. By August 2016, Fuller had hired Gretchen J. Berg and Aaron Harberts, who he had worked with on his earlier series Pushing Daisies, to serve as co-showrunners with him on Discovery. A month later, Fuller and Kurtzman asked CBS to delay the series' release so they could realistically meet the high expectations for the series, and the studio announced that the series premiere had been pushed back to May 2017. The pair said in a statement that "these extra few months will help us achieve a vision we can all be proud of."

A few weeks after the delay was announced, Fuller met with Sonequa Martin-Green about portraying the series' lead, a character that had been surprisingly difficult for the production to cast. Fuller felt he had "found the crucial piece of the puzzle", but the actress would not be released from her contract at AMC until her character's death on The Walking Dead was publicly revealed. This episode was not set to air until April 2017, meaning Discovery would have to be delayed again if Martin-Green was cast in the series. At the end of October, CBS asked Fuller to step down as showrunner. They announced that the production was being restructured to keep Fuller actively involved with the series, but not on a day-to-day production level as he shifted his focus fully to American Gods: Berg and Harberts were made sole showrunners of Discovery, working off a broad story arc and overall mythology established by Fuller; Kurtzman and Fuller would continue as executive producers, with Fuller still helping the writers break stories; and Akiva Goldsman would join the series as a supporting producer—similar to the role he held on Fringe alongside Kurtzman—to help the showrunners and other producers "juggle the demands of the series". In a statement, CBS reiterated that they were "extremely happy with [Fuller's] creative direction" for the series, and were committed to "seeing this vision through". However, some elements of the series that came directly from Fuller were soon dropped, including some "more heavily allegorical and complex story" points and some of his design plans. Fuller later confirmed that he was no longer involved in the series at all, which he said was "bittersweet ... I can only give them the material I've given them and hope that it is helpful for them." By the end of the year, Martin-Green had indeed been cast as the series' lead, and in May 2017, the episode order was expanded to 15. That June, CBS announced a new premiere date of September 24. The season was divided into two chapters, with an airing break after the ninth episode to allow time for post-production on episodes in the second half of the season to be completed.

Writing

Fuller wanted to differentiate the series from the previous 700+ episodes of Star Trek by taking advantage of the streaming format of All Access and telling a single story arc across the entire first season. He and the writers had completely planned this arc by the end of June 2016. Fuller said the original series episode "Balance of Terror", one of his favorites, would be a "touchstone" for the season's story direction. In August, Fuller teased that the story arc revolved around "an event in Star Trek history that's been talked about but never been explored", 10 years before the events of the original series. This was later revealed to be the Federation-Klingon cold war. Goldsman explained that this story would be told over the course of the first season and end with the creation of the Neutral Zone, allowing a new story to be told in potential future seasons. He described the events explored by the season as "sufficiently inexact [in previous Star Trek stories] that we can now fill in how we got there." He acknowledged that this time period has been widely covered by previous Star Trek novels, and explained that the series' writers considered these novels to be non-canon.

The writers felt that a traditional series might have begun with the series' protagonist, Michael Burnham, boarding the USS Discovery and then revealed her backstory through flashbacks. For Star Trek: Discovery, they wanted to take a different approach and begin with a prologue that explored Burnham's initial actions and her relationship to Captain Philippa Georgiou. Feeling that at least "two hours" were needed to convey this, the first two episodes of the season (released as a two-part premiere) cover this prologue, with the season's main story beginning with the third episode. The third episode was considered to be the series' equivalent of a pilot episode, and begins six months after the second. This time jump was inspired by film sequels that begin with significant events having transpired since the previous instalment such as Terminator 2: Judgment Day (1991). The third episode reveals that the season's story involves the development of a new form of space travel that could win the war for the Federation. When it was noted that this form of travel is not known in the previous Star Trek series (set later in the timeline), actor Jason Isaacs stated that the writers were aware of this, and were "very clear, in not a cop-out way, to both incorporate this stuff which is exciting and very visual, to make sure that it didn't rankle canon." The season's story is split into two "micro-arcs", covering the first nine episodes and then the rest of the season, with a break in airing between the two. It finishes with the end of the war, which comes down to an agreement between two characters. These negotiations are made entirely by female characters, which was an intentional choice that Kurtzman felt was justified by the Me Too movement. The writers felt this was true to the spirit of Star Trek, and allowed them to move beyond the war storyline that Fuller had established for the show. The second season is then set-up with the appearance of the USS Enterprise from previous Star Trek media. Harberts explained that the writers knew they would have to acknowledge the existence of the Enterprise at some point due to the series' place in the timeline, and after Fuller left they decided to just "tell this story now" with the second season.

Because of the season's focus on Klingons and their culture, the producers decided that members of the species would speak their own language with subtitles throughout the show. Berg said this was "very important for us ... They have their own pride. They have their own interests and talent." Klingons historically represented the Soviet Union, and were portrayed as becoming friendlier with the protagonists of Star Trek as the real Cold War ended. For Discovery, the Klingons and Starfleet are intended to represent different factions within the modern United States, with Harberts explaining that the writers wanted to introduce two different points of view and explore their differences. He said the season is ultimately about "finding a way to come together". Berg added that one of the main themes being explored for the season was the "universal" lesson of "you think you know 'the other,' but you really don't". The showrunners stated that where previous Star Trek series revolved around the relationships between central male characters, Discovery focuses more on female characters. They described a "friendship structure" that goes from Captain Georgiou to First Officer Burnham to Cadet Tilly. They also explained that the two main Starfleet captains in the series, Georgiou and Lorca, are "metaphors for how people and institutions act in times of conflict", with Georgiou responding to war as would be expected of a traditional Starfleet officer, but Lorca representing a more "complicated version of a Starfleet captain who can almost only exist during a time of war".

Casting

In addition to Martin-Green as protagonist Michael Burnham, the season's main cast includes Doug Jones as Saru, an alien lieutenant commander; Shazad Latif as Ash Tyler, a former prisoner of war; Anthony Rapp as Paul Stamets, an astromycologist; Mary Wiseman as Sylvia Tilly, a cadet; and Jason Isaacs as Gabriel Lorca, captain of the USS Discovery. Isaacs was just cast for one season. Not all of the show's characters are introduced in the first episode as would be done in a traditional television series, with the writers taking advantage of the serialized format to take their time introducing each character over several episodes. Tyler is eventually revealed to actually be the Klingon Voq disguised as a human. Voq was initially credited as being portrayed by the actor "Javid Iqbal", who was invented for the ruse to hide the fact that Latif was portraying both Voq and Tyler. The name Javid Iqbal comes from Latif's father.

In November 2016, series' writer and consulting producer Nicholas Meyer mentioned that Michelle Yeoh had been cast in Discovery, and she was soon confirmed to be portraying Captain Georgiou of the USS Shenzhou. A month later, Mary Chieffo was cast as the Klingon L'Rell. In April 2017, Kenneth Mitchell was cast as Kol, who Latif was originally cast as before he was recast as Voq. That July, Rapp revealed that Wilson Cruz, whom Rapp had previously worked with on the musical Rent, would portray Stamets' love interest Hugh Culber. Jayne Brook also has a recurring role in the season, as Admiral Katrina Cornwell. Additionally appearing throughout the season in "co-starring" roles are Emily Coutts as Keyla Detmer, Ali Momen as Kamran Gant, Chris Violette as Britch Weeton, Romain Waite as Troy Januzzi, Sara Mitich as Airiam, Oyin Oladejo as Joann Owosekun, Ronnie Rowe Jr. as R.A. Bryce, Conrad Coates as Terral, and Patrick Kwok-Choon as Rhys. Tasia Valenza and Julianne Grossman provided the computer voices for the Shenzhou and the Discovery, respectively.

Fuller said in August 2016 that the series would eventually include characters from previous Star Trek media, but he wanted to establish its own characters in the first season. He did express interest in including the  character Amanda Grayson from The Original Series, saying, "there's much to be told about that". She was later confirmed to be appearing in the season due to Burnham having been adopted by Grayson and her husband Sarek in Discovery backstory. James Frain was cast as Sarek by January 2017. Rainn Wilson was cast as another original series character, Harry Mudd, that March. In September, Harberts revealed that Mia Kirshner had been cast as Grayson. Katherine Barrell portrays Mudd's wife Stella. Clint Howard, who appeared in several previous Star Trek series, has a role in the season finale as an Orion drug dealer. The role was written specifically for Howard, who is friends with Goldsman.

Design

Sets and starships
Mark Worthington and Todd Cherniawsky served as initial production designers for the series, with Tamara Deverell taking over around the sixth episode. She was the first female production designer for the Star Trek franchise. After CBS told the writers to add an excursion to a planet for an upcoming episode, which became the visit to Pahvo, Deverell had 10 minutes to pitch a design for the new sets. She came up with the idea of a yurt consisting of membranes, based on a mathematical structure, which was added to a forest using visual effects. For the second half of the season, Deverell had to redesign the Mirror Universe, a classic location from previous series. Deverell said the previous depictions had "just slapped a logo on the wall" to represent the Mirror Universe's Terran Empire, but for this series her team created a multi-dimensional version of the Terran Empire logo and then augmented sets with new mirrors to further distance them from the Prime Universe sets. For the flagship spaceship of the Terran Empire, the ISS Charon, Deverell used a "monolithic, Brutalist, concrete form" for her designs.

The design of the USS Discovery is based on an unused Ralph McQuarrie design for the USS Enterprise from the unproduced film Star Trek: Planet of the Titans. The USS Shenzhou was designed to look older than the Discovery, and was compared more to a submarine from The Hunt for Red October (1990) than previous Star Trek spaceships. The Shenzhou is a Walker-class starship, a new designation created for the series that is named for test pilot Joe Walker. Sets for the Shenzhou and the Discoverys interiors were built for the series, described as a "tangle of corridors and rooms". In some cases, such as the transporter rooms and corridors, the same sets were used for both ships. These were dressed differently, with alternate lighting, graphics, and paint. The "turn over" process from depicting on ship to another within a set took up to a week.

Costumes
Fabric for the Starfleet uniforms seen in the series were custom-dyed in Switzerland; the costumes were cut and assembled in Toronto by costume designer Gersha Phillips and her department. For officers in combat situations or hazardous away missions, jumpsuit-versions of the main uniform were paired with armored vests. Also designed for the series was a Starfleet long haul space suit, which was built in the United Kingdom from sections of high-density foam that were then covered in fiberglass. Phillips designed traditional Vulcan robes for Sarek which were meant to reflect his devotion to logic and "serious intellectual pursuits". Vulcan pendants celebrating "Infinite Diversity in Infinite Combinations" were 3D printed and hand painted. For Harry Mudd's costume, primarily made of leather, Phillips was inspired by Adam Ant.

Klingons
Fuller had "really, really wanted" to redesign the Klingons, which he felt had inconsistent designs throughout the franchise's history. He wanted to portray the race as "sexy and vital and different" rather than "the thugs of the universe", and spent months working with prosthetics designer Neville Page and production designer Mark Worthington on the new look. Page was aware that changing the look of the Klingons would be controversial with Star Trek fans. The idea was to bring a fresh take to the Klingon race by creating a "high level of sophisticated detail—for a race that had long been perceived as brutal, one-minded, and simplistic".

Page first designed a generic, "realistic" Klingon skull, inspired by real biology, and then developed the different Klingons from that base in an evolution-based approach. The skull design includes spaces for "extra sensory receptors" running from the top of the head to the back, as Page wanted to show the Klingons to be apex predators with heightened senses. To not cover these receptors, the Klingons are depicted as being bald in the series, which is a design decision that was mandated by Fuller. It was important to the producers to show diversity within the Klingons, so the series depicts both light and dark skinned members of the species, and features different clothing, weapon, and armor designs for each of the 24 Klingon houses. Glenn Hetrick, co-founder of Alchemy Studios with Page, explained that the Klingon Empire covers many planets beyond the homeworld of Qo'noS and so different subsets of the species would have evolved on those different planets, each with different environments and cultures.

Hetrick and Page created armor and weapons with 3D printing and aluminum casts made from hand carved moulds. Some props, such as helmets, were designed to be augmented with visual effects. Weapons like Klingon ceremonial blades and gun-like disruptors were reimagined versions of previous props from franchise, especially Star Trek: The Next Generation. The overall design for Klingon weapons, helmets, and armor was based on the culture notes created for the species in the original series, which included influences from Middle Eastern, Mongolian, and Byzantine culture. Several motifs recur throughout the designs for the Klingons' weapons and armor, including their skulls and vertebrae, images of Klingons "poised to thrust themselves into the honor of battle", and images of Klingons sacrificing themselves in battle. The latter is similar to the emblem of the Klingon Empire.

Phillips and Suttirat Anne Larlarb created the clothing worn by the Klingon T'Kuvma and his followers, inspired more by "ancient Klingon ways" than the costumes seen previously in Star Trek. T'Kuvma wears a tunic created from three different types of leather and a chest plate made with 3D printed beads, decorated with Swarovski crystals. Costumes for his followers were created with individually stained, painted, modelled, and hand-pressed pieces of leather. Each suit took ten costumers 110 hours to complete. Different colored leather was used to differentiate males and females. A notable set of armor created for the season is the Torchbearer armor, which is worn in a ritual to unite the Klingon houses. It was made from 100 individually 3D printed pieces. When first describing the Torchbearer armor, Fuller referred to baroque and samurai styles. Kol, a member of the house of Kor that appeared in the original series, wears more leather and a different set of armor that is closer to those worn previously by Klingons in the franchise. US$3 million was spent on a "massive" ship set for T'Kuvma's house, known as the "Klingon sarcophagus ship", which was designed to look like an alien cathedral. The outside of the ship is covered in coffins ranging from days old to hundreds of years old. The set also included Klingon text and glyphs inspired by the novel The Final Reflection, which helped develop Klingon culture and language. Other details that were taken from the novel include the strategy game Klin zha and Klingon bloodwine cups. Research was done on how written languages evolve to accurately depict the ancient form of Klingon written on the ship. Instead of physical displays like Starfleet's ships, the sarcophagus ship uses holographic displays created with visual effects.

The Klingon homeworld of Qo'noS is visited in the season finale, though the town depicted is an Orion outpost. The production team attempted to reuse existing sets given any new sets would potentially not be reused. The graveyard chamber from the sarcophagus ship set was turned into an Orion sex cabaret, with other sets including a Klingon drinking tent and street stalls. The Orion elements were inspired by Indian architecture, with fabrics from Morocco and other "far east" countries, as these were the inspirations for the original Orion designs in previous Star Trek series. Deverell described the sets as "lush like a bordello in the 1800s. We were allowed to go crazy."

Filming
Filming for the season began at Pinewood Toronto Studios on January 24, 2017, with cinematographers including Guillermo Navarro, working on the pilot, and Colin Hoult. Set construction had initially been set to begin within a month of June 2016, for a filming period of that September to around March 2017, but by that September, production was not expected to begin until November. After Fuller stepped down as showrunner, set construction was expected to be completed by the end of 2016, with filming to begin "shortly thereafter". By mid-May 2017, filming for scenes set on an unidentified planet had taken place on location in Jordan. Some of the series' sets took over six weeks to create, and new sets were being built up until the end of production on the season. Some episodes for the season were restricted to a few existing sets, making them bottle episodes, though Harberts said the series would not do anything "as bottle-y as 'everyone is stuck in the mess hall!'" Additional location shooting took place around Ontario, Canada, including at the Aga Khan Museum in Toronto which stood in for the Vulcan Science Academy, and in the Hilton Falls and Kelso Conservation Areas for the forest planet Pahvo. Filming for the season concluded on October 11, 2017.

For the visual scope of the series, Kurtzman felt that the show had to "justify being on a premium cable service". The showrunners were particularly inspired by Star Trek: The Motion Picture and its "wider scope", with Harberts explaining that the first season was shot in a 2:1 aspect ratio which "just lends itself to a very lyrical way of telling the story." He added that some of the series' visuals were influenced by the modern Star Trek films from J. J. Abrams. Some of these influences, per Goldsman, are "the ability to be creative cinematically...the intimate discourse, the humanistic storytelling with the giant canvas that is Star Trek. A more kinetic camera, a more dynamic way of existing". The producers worked closely with pilot director David Semel to make the series look as cinematic as possible, including filming the bridge of Starfleet's ships in such a way as "not to shoot in a sort of proscenium box...to be able to get the camera into spaces where, you know, to shoot it in interesting ways, which is a combination of choreographing a scene to motivate the camera moving, and also lighting." The cinematographers wanted to emphasize on-set sourcing, with lighting built in wherever it would naturally appear to help create a more realistic feel, and distance the series from the "stage" feel of The Original Series.

Robyn Stewart, an expert in the Klingon language, and linguist Rea Nolan worked closely with the Klingon actors to ensure they could both speak and understand their lines in the language, having the actors practice while their makeup and prosthetics were being applied, which took three hours each day. They would first rehearse their lines in English, and worked to "inhabit [the lines] emotionally". Chieffo felt that "it makes sense that when we are speaking to each other we are speaking in our native tongue and really adding a fluidity and nuance", while Mitchell said, "It's an incredibly complex language ... it feels alien. Because it is incredibly difficult and I don't speak the language it takes a lot of muscle memory to memorize each separate syllable over and over and over." For a sequence where L'Rell and Tyler are shown having sex, Chieffo required full-body prosthetics which took four hours to apply. Though these are only seen for around 30 seconds in the episode, Chieffo felt strongly that she film the scene rather than a body double.

Visual effects
The season has 5000 visual effects shots, which visual effects supervisor Jason Zimmerman said was similar to one feature-length film. He said the department was aiming for "high-end" effects, similar to those seen in films, and the number of visual effects in each episode was always driven by the story. Pixomondo was the primary visual effects vendor, with Spin VFX and Crafty Apes also working on the show. The shot that went through the most iterations during the season was a simple composite of computer screen graphics onto an on-set monitor, with 146 different iterations of the graphics tried before the final design was chosen.

Music
Composer Jeff Russo wrote several themes for the series, in addition to the main title theme, but not necessarily for the different characters in the show as would often be done. Instead, Russo wanted to focus on the emotions of the characters over the story beats, for instance, "Even when you are shooting, you're still feeling, so why not play that as opposed to 'Oh my god, he's got a gun'". Like the rest of the series' departments, Russo's aim was to make the score feel as cinematic as possible.

For the Kasseelian Opera that Stamets talks about later in the season, Russo did not want to attempt to make a "futuristic opera", believing instead that "opera is opera" and that it should have the same style as what is heard during the present day. For the seventh episode, source music from Wyclef Jean is used which Russo compared to people in the current day listening to the music of Johann Sebastian Bach. Singer Ayana Haviv recorded arias for the opera, and in a "moment of inspiration" Russo asked her to sing the vocal section of the original Star Trek theme. Russo and Kurtzman responded positively to her rendition, and Russo arranged the theme for the series' 74-piece orchestra to play over the end credits of the season finale after the USS Enterprise appears. Haviv altered her voice for the final recording to match the original 1960s style of the theme.

A soundtrack album for the first chapter of the season was released digitally on December 15, 2017, by Lakeshore Records. Another, for the second chapter, was released digitally on April 6, 2018. CD versions of both albums were set for release in 2018, along with a vinyl release combining selections from both chapters and titled "Intergalactic Starburst" Vinyl. All music composed by Jeff Russo:

Marketing
With the announcement of the series' title in July 2016 came a promotional video giving a first look at the USS Discovery. The video did not feature final designs, as the producers had put it together in three weeks to show the concepts for the series to fans. In January 2017, a YouTube video presented by Alcatel was released, using 360° technology to showcase digital models of previous Star Trek ships. The first full trailer for the series was released in May 2017. Chris Harnick of E! News said the trailer was gorgeous and cinematic, and added, because of the appearances of both Sarek and the Klingons, that "this is the Star Trek you know and love." Aja Romano at Vox called the trailer's visuals "sumptuous [and] modern, but still very much in keeping with the aesthetic of previous Trek series". She did note that the series' plot was not conveyed in the trailer.

In July 2017, Discovery had an extensive presence at San Diego Comic-Con, including a panel featuring Martin-Green, Isaacs, Jones, Latif, Wiseman, Rapp, Frain, Kurtzman, Berg, Kadin, Harberts, and Goldsman, and moderated by Wilson. Footage from the series was screened at the panel, with a new trailer released online soon afterwards. CBS also created an immersive art experience at the Michael J. Wolf Fine Arts Gallery, featuring the USS Discoverys captain's chair and other props, costumes, and sketches from the series, as well as limited edition posters and a shop selling Comic-Con-exclusive items. Pedicabs inspired by the series gave free rides through the Gaslamp District, while a "#TrekDiscovery Challenge" competition saw fans have to take pictures with "authentically costumed Trek ambassadors", one each representing the crews of the five previous Star Trek series, as well as the captain's chair at the art gallery, and post them online with the hashtag #TrekDiscovery to be eligible to win a Roku streaming stick and a subscription to CBS All Access. At the convention, Gentle Giant Studios revealed that they had gained the license to create mini-busts and statues based on the series, and planned to particularly focus on the series' Klingons. At the beginning of August, an afternoon of four panels at the Star Trek Las Vegas event was dedicated to the series, featuring producers and writers, actors who were not present at Comic-Con, creature designers, and writers involved with related books and comics.

By the beginning of September, promotion was taking place around the world: Isaacs was involved in the Blackpool Illuminations festival in the UK; cast and crew promoted the series at the Fan Expo Canada; a USS Shenzhou-themed photobooth, that took pictures of fans as Klingons, was in operation at the IFA consumer electronics trade show in Berlin; and an outdoor campaign of posters and billboards was underway, including a large billboard on the roof of an LAX Airport building. The night before the premiere, a model of the USS Discovery was flown above the Hudson River on Manhattan's west side. Created by Remarkable Media, the  skeleton rig was covered in LEDs and suspended from a Black Hawk helicopter. On October 7, panels for the series were held at both the PaleyFest television festival and at New York Comic Con.

Release

Broadcast and streaming
Star Trek: Discovery premiered at the ArcLight Hollywood on September 19, 2017. The first episode aired in a "preview broadcast" on CBS in the United States on September 24, and was made available for free on CBS All Access along with the second episode (which required an All Access subscription). Subsequent first-run episodes, making up the first chapter of the season, were streamed weekly on All Access through November 5. The second chapter streamed from January 7 to February 11, 2018.

CBS Studios International licensed the series to Bell Media for broadcast in Canada, and to Netflix for another 188 countries. In Canada, the premiere was broadcast on September 24, 2017, on both the CTV Television Network and on the specialty channels Space (English) and Z (French) before being streamed on CraveTV, with subsequent episodes just broadcast on Space and Z before streaming on CraveTV. In the other countries, Netflix released each episode of the series for streaming within 24 hours of its U.S. debut. This agreement with CBS also saw Bell and Netflix acquire all previous Star Trek series to stream in their entirety.

In August 2020, CBS announced that it would be broadcasting the full first season of Discovery beginning on September 24, 2020, alongside other older or acquired series, due to the lack of television content available to the network due to the COVID-19 pandemic. Also in September, ViacomCBS announced that CBS All Access would be expanded and rebranded as Paramount+ in March 2021. Existing episodes of the season remained on Paramount+ along with future seasons of the series. In November 2021, ViacomCBS announced that it had bought back the international streaming rights to Discovery from Netflix effective immediately.

Broadcast breach
After reviewing the episode "Choose Your Pain", Space chose to air it uncensored despite its use of the word "fuck" and depictions of violence. The Canadian Broadcast Standards Council received an official complaint about this given the channel aired the episode before 9pm, since series intended for adult audiences should be shown after that time according to the Canadian Association of Broadcasters' Code of Ethics and Violence Code. The complainant, the Council, and Space itself acknowledged that the use of the word was unexpected given the franchise's "51 year track record of being fairly clean with regards to its content." The Council found Space to have breached the regulations in not censoring the episode or scheduling it post-watershed, and required the channel to air an announcement stating as such twice during the week following April 19, 2018. At the time, Bell Media accepted the decision and agreed to comply with the ruling, but did not indicate any intention to change their approach to broadcasting future seasons of the series.

Home media
The season was released on DVD and Blu-Ray formats in the U.S. on November 13, 2018. The release included two hours of bonus features, including deleted and extended scenes, and behind-the-scenes featurettes. On November 2, 2021, a home media box set collecting the first three seasons of Discovery was released, with more than eight hours of special features including behind-the-scenes featurettes, deleted and extended scenes, audio commentaries, and gag reels.

Reception

Ratings and viewership
According to Nielsen Media Research, the CBS broadcast of the first episode was watched by a "decent" audience of 9.5 million viewers. The premiere of the series led to record subscriptions for All Access, with the service attributing its biggest day, week, and month of signups to the debut of Star Trek: Discovery. According to "app analytics specialist" App Annie, the premiere of the series caused the number of downloads of the All Access mobile app to more than double. Following a 7-day trial period for new subscribers, revenue from the app for CBS doubled on October 1 compared to the average in-app revenue during the previous 30 days.

Critical response

The review aggregator website Rotten Tomatoes reported an 82% approval rating for the first season, with an average rating of 7/10 based on 371 reviews. The website's critical consensus reads, "Although it takes an episode to achieve liftoff, Star Trek: Discovery delivers a solid franchise instalment for the next generation—boldly led by the charismatic Sonequa Martin-Green." The average rating for each of the season's individual episodes is 89%. Metacritic, which uses a weighted average, assigned a score of 72 out of 100 based on reviews from 20 critics, indicating "generally favorable reviews".

Matt Zoller Seitz of Vulture praised the series' premiere, feeling it "stands tall alongside the best-regarded incarnations of the Trek franchise... with an almost entirely new slate of characters... and casts them with actors you can't help but like". Writing for Vox, Emily VanDerWerff noted "the best thing about Discovery is that Michael Burnham, played beautifully by Martin-Green, does stuff. She gets in trouble. She breaks rules. She violates Starfleet protocol. She has emotions that get the best of her, even as she knows they shouldn't. She is, in other words, very human". Overall, she declared that "Star Trek is best when it's hopeful, but hope shines brightest amid horror. On some level, Discovery knows both of those things". Writing for TVLine, Dave Nemetz graded the premiere episode a B+, saying, "The nail-bitingly tense premiere delivered a cracking good action story, eye-popping special effects and a number of gasp-worthy twists" that was worth the wait. Maureen Ryan of Variety, after watching the first two episodes, said the series "has yet to prove itself a worthy successor to The Next Generation or Deep Space Nine. But there are reasons to hope that Discovery will be a promising addition to the Trek canon".

Chaim Gartenberg for The Verge criticized the "extended prologue" approach, but called the two-part premiere "surprisingly satisfying". He praised Burnham as a "far more rounded, human character than any of the previous captains, with some serious trauma from a Klingon attack in her youth that's left her predisposed to hate the warrior race. And while Star Trek has plumbed the 'main character has demons' well in the past—most notably with Sisko in Deep Space Nine, and Picard in the later films, when it comes to the Borg—Burnham feels far more compelling for not being a flawless human being in other respects, as her series-protagonist predecessors were." Writing for Entertainment Weekly, Darren Franich gave the two-part premiere a B grade, praising Martin-Green's performance as the lead and the production design as well as commenting on the "undeniable appeal" of the "introduction of a new ship, the revelation that we're watching that ship's final voyage, the cliffhanger possibility that our new hero is a fallen angel." However, he felt that the series' third episode retroactively made the two episode prologue "feel even more overextended". Patrick Cooley of cleveland.com criticized the dialogue and "wooden, bewilderingly stupid" characters in the first two episodes. Brian Lowry from CNN called the first three episodes "Star Trek Lite", criticizing the bridge crew and lore, and describing the series as an "unspectacular addition" to the franchise that was mostly designed "to entice new subscribers to CBS All Access."

Discussing the season as a whole, Seitz praised it as the strongest first season of any Star Trek series since the original and defended it against fan criticisms, believing that most complaints about the series could be applied to all Star Trek series or were about intentional differences from those prior series that Seitz saw as "honorable attempts" to modernize the franchise "while still keeping the whole thing recognizably Trek." Seitz in particularly praised the more serialized storytelling, visual effects, original characters like Burnham and Saru, existing characters like Frain's Sarek and Wilson's Harry Mudd, and the themes of science vs. war that the series explored. On the latter, Seitz felt Discovery improved on the efforts of the J. J. Abrams Star Trek films. Discussing the "hits" and "misses" of the season, Witney Seibold of IGN praised the characters, effects, and design as "hits", but criticized as "misses" the tone and storytelling for respectively being too busy and having too many subplots. Gartenberg criticized the writers for over-using science fiction tropes, repeating plot elements, inconsistently portraying characters' attitudes, and for being unsubtle with the values of Starfleet in the finale. He was optimistic for further seasons though, feeling that the end of the season left "the entire slate of the show ... wiped clean for whatever comes next." At Mashable, Chris Taylor felt the Klingons' prosthetics made it difficult to see the actors' emotions, the development of the characters Tyler and Lorca was wasted, the rest of the bridge characters were not explored enough, and the ending of the Klingon war storyline was rushed in the season finale before the Enterprise reveal "left us on the oldest, safest, most recognizable piece of Trek fan service ever."

Accolades
Netflix listed Star Trek: Discovery fourth in its list of series most watched together by families in 2017. Martin-Green was named TVLine's Performer of the Week for her performance in "The Wolf Inside", in which Burnham is "put through the emotional wringer with a barrage of jaw-dropping twists, giving Martin-Green an opportunity to deliver her finest performance of the season." In January 2019, Comic Book Resources rated Discoverys first season as the ninth best season of all Star Trek series so far, comparing its high production values to a feature film and calling Michael Burnham "the most interesting character Trek has provided us in generations".

References

External links
 
 

2017 American television seasons
2018 American television seasons
1
Split television seasons